Edward William Thompson (July 1894 – 6 November 1918) was an English amateur footballer who made one appearance in the Football League for Fulham as a left back.

Personal life 
Thompson worked as a putter and stoneman at Emma Colliery, Ryton. He enlisted as a private in the Scots Guards in February 1917, during the First World War. Two months later, his brother Charlton was killed in France while serving with the Durham Light Infantry. Thompson was involved in the Battle of the Sambre-Oise Canal on 4 November 1918, and was killed in action while serving with the 2nd Battalion, Scots Guards at Bermeries two days later, just five days before the armistice with Germany. He was one of the two last English footballers to die in the war, dying on the same day as George Lake. He was buried in Bermeries Communal Cemetery.

Career statistics

References

1894 births
1918 deaths
Military personnel from Northumberland
People from Prudhoe
Footballers from Northumberland
Association football fullbacks
English footballers
Spen Black and White F.C. players
Fulham F.C. players
English Football League players
British Army personnel of World War I
Scots Guards soldiers
British military personnel killed in World War I
English miners